Lambton West was an electoral riding in Ontario, Canada. It was created in 1875 from the western portion of Lambton, and was centred on Sarnia. It was abolished in 1966 before the 1967 election. Most of the urban portion became Sarnia, while the more rural portion was merged with Lambton East to form a recreated Lambton.

Members of Provincial Parliament

References

Former provincial electoral districts of Ontario